RNA exonuclease 4 is an enzyme that in humans is encoded by the REXO4 gene.

References

Further reading